Kathy Mar (from Chinese  by analogy with non-rhotic accents) is an American filk singer.

Career
Mar worked as a professional folk singer and street performer in Denver, Colorado for many years before discovering filk. Her first recordings were for Off Centaur Publications (Songbird, On a Bright Wind, Bamboo Wind) and she went on to record two albums with Thor Records (Plus Ça Change, Plus C'est La Même Chose) which have recently been re-released as a double CD. She also recorded an album for Dandelion Digital (Made by Magic) with British songwriter Zander Nyrond, one of the first filk CDs ever produced. Her album of filk and folk covers on Prometheus (My Favorite Sings) was her most successful release. She was inducted into the Filk Hall of Fame in its second year of existence. With Lindy Sears, she instigated the 'Dandelion Conspiracy' to promote filk to general science-fiction conventions.

She was Filk Guest of Honor at Denvention 3, the 66th World Science Fiction Convention.

Personal life
Mar lives in a commune in San Leandro, California. She has had four children: Michael (1970–1982), Melanie (1972) and twins Nicolas and Cassandra (1985). She lives with her primary life partner Dean Dierschow, also her roadie, in what she refers to as 'a wonderful ongoing courtship'. She was involved in the antiwar movement in the 1960s, and sang in Kansas City for the first Moratorium.

Pegasus Awards
 1989 — Best Filk Song - Arafel's Song (Tree of Swords & Jewels)  (with Mercedes Lackey)
 1989 — Best Writer/Composer
 1991 — Best Love Song - Velveteen
 1993 — Best Writer/Composer
 1994 — Best Filk Song - Drink Up the River
 1996 — Best Filk Song - When Giants Walked
 2004 — Best Writer/Composer

Albums
 Songbird — Off Centaur (cassette OCP-24) 1982
 On a Bright Wind — Off Centaur (cassette OCP-36) 1984
 Bamboo Wind — Off Centaur (cassette OCP-54) 1985
 Plus Ca Change — Thor Records (cassette FK1003) 1988
 Plus C'est La Même Chose — Thor Records (cassette FK1006) 1990
 Made By Magic — with Zander Nyrond, Dandelion Digital CD DD-005CD, 1994
 My Favorite Sings — Prometheus Music CD PM-1000, 1999
 Plus Ca Change / Plus C'est La Même Chose — DragonsGate Music CD 2000
 Kathy Mar - Live — Love Song Productions CD/DVD LSP2004 2009

External links
 Official site
 last.fm page with Kathy's music available for free streaming
 Official Pegasus Award site listing Kathy Mar's awards

References

Filkers
Living people
1951 births
People from San Leandro, California
Musicians from Denver
American women guitarists
American anti–Vietnam War activists
American street performers
20th-century American women
21st-century American women